Matheus Bitencourt da Silva (28 June 1995 – 28 November 2016), known as Matheus Biteco, was a Brazilian professional footballer who played as a defensive midfielder for Chapecoense.

Matheus Biteco was one of the victims when LaMia Airlines Flight 2933 crashed on 28 November 2016.

Club career
Matheus Biteco was born in Porto Alegre, Rio Grande do Sul, and joined Grêmio's youth setup in 2001 at the age of five. He made his senior debut on 1 February 2013, coming on as a second half substitute in a 0–4 Campeonato Gaúcho away loss against São Luiz. He was handed his first start 13 days later, in a 5–0 Campeonato Gaúcho home routing of Santa Cruz; his older brother Guilherme also started the match.

Matheus Biteco made his Série A debut on 14 July 2013, replacing Souza in a 2–1 home win against Botafogo. Definitely promoted to the main squad ahead of the 2014 season, he started to feature more regularly, contributing with 18 league matches.

In December 2014, Matheus Biteco's federative rights were sold to a group of businessmen, being assigned to Santa Catarina-based club Barra and being loaned back to Grêmio for the season. He would spend the vast majority of the year nursing a pubalgia in Switzerland, however.

In February 2016 Matheus Biteco joined TSG 1899 Hoffenheim, but failed to appear in any matches for the club. On 5 July, he was announced at Chapecoense.

At Chape Matheus Biteco became a regular starter, also helping the side to reach the 2016 Copa Sudamericana Finals for the first time in their history.

Death
On 28 November 2016, whilst travelling with Chapecoense to the aforementioned finals, Matheus Biteco was among the fatalities of the LaMia Flight 2933 accident in the Colombian village of Cerro Gordo, La Unión, Antioquia.

Personal life
Matheus Biteco's brothers Guilherme and Gabriel, are also footballers; all of them were groomed at Grêmio. The former is an attacking midfielder, while the latter is a forward.

Career statistics

Honours

Club
Chapecoense
Copa Sudamericana: 2016 (posthumously)

International
Brazil U20
Toulon Tournament: 2013

References

External links

1995 births
2016 deaths
Footballers from Porto Alegre
Brazilian footballers
Association football midfielders
Campeonato Brasileiro Série A players
Grêmio Foot-Ball Porto Alegrense players
Associação Chapecoense de Futebol players
TSG 1899 Hoffenheim players
Brazil under-20 international footballers
Brazilian expatriate footballers
Brazilian expatriate sportspeople in Germany
Expatriate footballers in Germany
Footballers killed in the LaMia Flight 2933 crash